Theodore Mook (born February 26, 1953, Mount Kisco, New York) is an American cellist who has played in more than 1,000 Broadway performances in New York City, produced records, played on motion picture soundtracks and, along with Ezra Sims, invented computer fonts used in microtonal music composition. He is best known for his interest and contributions to microtonality music.

Mook began his music career in Boston, Massachusetts after graduating Boston University. He was a member of Dinosaur Annex Music Ensemble and played with other ensembles in the area before relocating to New York City in 1983. In New York, Mook performed cello in Broadway shows Little Women, Bombay Dreams, Taboo and Jekyll & Hyde. He also played with the New York Consortium for New Music, at the Metropolitan Museum of Art, The Lincoln Center for the Performing Arts and at other venues around the city.

Outside of New York City, Mook has performed at the Library of Congress, the American Academy in Rome, the Los Angeles County Museum of Art and John F. Kennedy Center for the Performing Arts, among other venues. He performed cello for the soundtracks for the Wendigo (film) and Space Cowboys.

After moving to Charlestown, Rhode Island, Mook played alongside Grammy-winning artist Eugene Friesen.

Discography

References

External links

1953 births
Living people
Microtonal composers
American male classical composers
American classical composers
20th-century American composers
20th-century American male musicians